Jeremy Ylvisaker is a multi-instrumentalist from Minneapolis, Minnesota. He is a member of the indie rock bands Alpha Consumer and The Cloak Ox.

Career
He is a member of Alpha Consumer along with Michael Lewis and JT Bates. The band has released three albums, including Kick Drugs Out of America (2011).

He is also a member of The Cloak Ox along with Andrew Broder of Fog, Mark Erickson and Dosh. In 2011, the band released the debut EP Prisen. In the same year, It was announced that The Cloak Ox is a winner of the City Pages "Picked to Click" poll.

He plays guitar in Andrew Bird's touring band alongside Martin Dosh on drums and Michael Lewis on bass.

Discography

Jeremy Ylvisaker

 Welcome to Christmastown (2008)
 Malibu Hymnal (2017)
 Dimebag (2017)

Alpha Consumer
 Alpha Consumer (2006)
 Gary Victorsen’s (2008)
 Kick Drugs Out of America (2011)
 Meat (2014)

The Cloak Ox
 Prisen (2011)
 Shoot The Dog (2013)

The Suburbs
 Hey Muse (2017)

Contributions
 Dosh - Dosh (2002)
 Mark Mallman - The Red Bedroom (2002)
 Dosh - The Lost Take (2006)
 Mark Mallman - Between the Devil and Middle C (2006)
 Fog - Ditherer (2007)
 Dosh - Wolves and Wishes (2008)
 Luke Redfield - Fire Mountain (2008)
 Andrew Bird - Noble Beast (2009)
 Eyedea and Abilities - By the Throat (2009)
 Haley Bonar - Golder (2011)
 Luke Redfield - Ephemeral Eon (2010)
 Andrew Bird - Break It Yourself (2012)
 Andrew Bird - Hands of Glory
 Luke Redfield - Tusen Takk (2012)
 Mark Mallman - Double Silhouette (2012)
 Haley Bonar - Last War (2014)

References

External links
 The Cloak Ox on Totally Gross National Product
 Jeremy Ylvisaker on Myspace
 Featured on the MN Original program from the St. Paul, MN PBS Station: Honey Effigy Video on MN Original a

Guitarists from Minnesota
Living people
American male guitarists
Year of birth missing (living people)